The grands établissements  ("great establishments") are French public institutions under ministerial charter under the administrative category referred to as Établissements publics à caractère scientifique, culturel et professionnel (EPCSP).

Public institutions under ministerial charter within the Ministry of National Education and Research
Ministry of National Education, Advanced Instruction, and Research The Collège de France 
 The Conservatoire National des Arts et Métiers 
 The École centrale des arts et manufactures, also called École Centrale Paris or Centrale (ECP) 
 The University of Lorraine, often abbreviated in UL
 The École nationale des chartes 
 The École nationale de l'aviation civile (ENAC)
 The École nationale supérieure d'arts et métiers or  Arts et Métiers ParisTech
 The École nationale supérieure des sciences de l'information et des bibliothèques, also called "ENSSIB"
 The École pratique des hautes études (EPHE)
 The École des hautes études en sciences sociales (EHESS)  
 The Institut d'Études Politiques de Paris, also called Sciences Po 
 The Institut de Physique du Globe de Paris (IPGP) 
 The Institut national des langues et civilisations orientales or Langues-O (INALCO) 
 The Muséum national d'histoire naturelle (MNHN) 
 The Observatoire de Paris
 The Université Paris-Dauphine or Dauphine
 The Institut polytechnique de Grenoble or  Grenoble INP

Public institutions under ministerial charter within the Ministry of the Economy, Finance and IndustryMinistry of the Economy, Finance and Industry Institut Mines-Télécom (Institut Mines-Télécom, gathering Telecom ParisTech, École des Mines-Télécom de Lille-Douai (IMT Lille Douai), Telecom Bretagne, Telecom & Management SudParis (ex INT), Institut Eurécom)

Public institutions under ministerial charter within the Ministry of CultureMinistry of Culture' The French Academy in Rome or Villa Médicis 
 The Bibliothèque nationale de France (BNF) 
 The Comédie-Française
 The Conservatoire national supérieur d'art dramatique (CNSAD) The Conservatoire national supérieur de musique et de danse de Paris (CNSMDP) 
 The École Nationale Supérieure d'Architecture de Paris-Belleville
 The École du Louvre 
 The École nationale supérieure des beaux-arts or Beaux-arts (ENSBA, ENS Villa Arson) The École nationale supérieure des arts décoratifs or arts-déco (ENSAD) The École nationale supérieure des métiers de l'image et du son or Fémis''
 The École nationale supérieure d'arts à la Villa Arson
 The École Normale de Musique de Paris

See also
 Grande école

Notes and references

External links
 —Research and higher education institutions in France

 
Educational institutions in France
Public universities in France